目をそらした瞬間 -the thing which solomon overlooked- chronicle is a 4-disc compilation album by the Japanese experimental band Boris. Compared to most of the band's discography, this series of albums contains primarily improvised music. It was released exclusively in Japan on March 20, 2013 through Daymare Recordings, collecting three previously released volumes as well as a newly recorded volume in the same style. This is currently the only way to get any of the volumes on CD. In addition, all four installments in the series are available on Bandcamp as of September 4, 2020.

The fourth volume, 目をそらした瞬間 -The Thing Which Solomon Overlooked Extra- was released separately in 2014 on vinyl in a cardboard box designed to hold the previously released vinyl volumes.

"a bao a qu" is also the title of another, seemingly unrelated track that appears in several different forms: one used for a single and video compilation; another for Sound Track from Film "Mabuta no Ura"; and yet another for Boris / Variations + Live in Japan. "No Ones Grieve Part 2" was reused with additional vocals on Smile.

Track listing

Credits
 Takeshi – Vocals, guitar and bass
 Wata – Guitar, echo, keyboards
 Atsuo – Drums and percussion
 Michio Kurihara – Guitar on track "Howl Part 2"
 Seiichiruo Morikawa – Vocals on tracks "Howl Part 1" and "Howl Part 2"
 Nene & Nana – Vocals on track "Howl Part 1"
 Souichiro Nakamura – Mastering, remastering (all); mixing (vol 1)
 Fangsanalsatan – Recording (all); mixing (volumes 2-4)

References

2009 albums
Boris (band) albums